Isla Guy Fawkes (also known as Guy Fawkes Island) is a collection of two crescent shaped islands and two small rocks north-west of Santa Cruz Island, in the Galápagos Islands, which are part of Ecuador. The islands are uninhabited, but are sometimes visited by scuba divers.

William Beebe visited the islands and makes mention of them in his book Galapagos: World's End. He described the cliffs, made of stratified layers of volcanic tuff, as majestic, and also noted a population of Galápagos sea lions.

The island is perhaps best known for its name, which is derived from the controversial English historical figure Guy Fawkes, a Roman Catholic revolutionary who attempted to carry out the Gunpowder Plot in 1605.

References

External links
Satellite view of Isla Guy Fawkes

Islands of the Galápagos Islands
Uninhabited islands of Ecuador
Guy Fawkes